Skënder Hodja (born 30 May 1960) is an Albanian retired footballer.

Playing career

Club
His former team is 17 Nëntori Tirana, where he played all of his career and won three league titles in a team boasting the likes of international players Mirel Josa, Shkëlqim Muça, Arben Minga and Agustin Kola.

International
Hodja was part of Albania's 1984 UEFA European Under-21 Championship squad. He made his senior debut for Albania in an October 1984 FIFA World Cup qualification match against Belgium and earned a total of 21 caps, scoring no goals. His final international was a November 1990 European Championship qualification match against France.

Managerial career
He is currently the head coach of KF Tirana U-17.

Honours
 Albanian Superliga (3): 1984–85, 1987–88, 1988–89

References

External links

1960 births
Living people
Association football midfielders
Albanian footballers
Albania international footballers
Albania under-21 international footballers
KF Tirana players